Iljas is a village in Himarë  municipality (13 kilometres from the town), Vlorë County, southern Albania. It is located near the Ionian coast on the Albanian Riviera.

Demographics 
The village of Iljas is inhabited by an Eastern Orthodox Albanian population.

History
In 1720, the villages of Himara, Palasë, Ilias, Vuno, Pilur and Qeparo refused to submit to the Pasha of Delvina.

References

Populated places in Himara
Villages in Vlorë County
Albanian Ionian Sea Coast
Labëria